Mount Nipha is a hill, 760 m, standing almost precisely in the center of White Island, in the Ross Archipelago. Nipha is a Greek word for snow. So named by the New Zealand Geological Survey Antarctic Expedition (NZGSAE) (1958–59) because the hill is surrounded by ice and snow.

References

External links

Mountains of the Ross Dependency
White Island (Ross Archipelago)